Edward Heywood Jr. (December 4, 1915 – January 3, 1989) was an American  jazz pianist particularly active in the 1940s and 1950s.

Biography
Heywood was born in Atlanta, Georgia, United States. His father, Eddie Heywood Sr., was also a jazz musician from the 1920s and provided him with training from the age of 12 as an accompanist playing in the pit band in a vaudeville theater in Atlanta, occasionally accompanying singers such as Bessie Smith and Ethel Waters. Heywood moved, first to New Orleans and then to Kansas City, when vaudeville began to be replaced by sound pictures. Heywood played with jazz musicians such as Wayman Carver in 1932, Clarence Love from 1934 to 1937 and Benny Carter, who heard him in Kansas City playing with Clarence Love, from 1939 to 1940 after moving to New York City in 1938.

After starting his band, Heywood would occasionally provide accompaniment for Billie Holiday in 1941. In 1943, Heywood took several solos on a Coleman Hawkins quartet date (including "The Man I Love") and put together a sextet, including Doc Cheatham (tpt), Vic Dickenson (tb), Lem Davis (as), Al Lucas (b), and Jack Parker (d). After their version of "Begin the Beguine" became a hit in 1944, the group had three successful years. "Begin the Beguine" sold over one million copies, and was awarded a gold disc by the RIAA.

In 1947, Heywood was stricken with a partial paralysis of his hands and was unable to perform. However, he made a comeback in 1951. In the 1950s, Heywood composed and recorded "Land of Dreams" and "Soft Summer Breeze" (1956) (which peaked at number 11 on the Billboard chart). His 1956 recording of his composition "Canadian Sunset" (which peaked at number 2) which he recorded with Hugo Winterhalter and his orchestra for RCA Victor. After a second partial paralysis from 1966 to 1969, Heywood made another comeback and continued his career into the 1980s.

Heywood died at home in Miami Beach, Florida, aged 73. Parkinson's disease had been complicated by Alzheimer's disease, and Heywood had been in poor health for five years.

Eddie Heywood has a "Star" at 1709 Vine Street on the Hollywood Walk of Fame.

References

External links
 Eddie Heywood at Allmusic.com
 Eddie Heywood and His Orchestra discography at Discogs.com
 Eddie Heywood recordings at the Discography of American Historical Recordings.

1915 births
1989 deaths
American jazz pianists
American male pianists
Liberty Records artists
Musicians from Atlanta
Okeh Records artists
RCA Victor artists
20th-century American pianists
20th-century American male musicians
American male jazz musicians